The Scientific and Technological Research Institution of Turkey (TÜBİTAK) is a national agency of Turkey whose stated goal is to develop "science, technology and innovation" (STI) policies, support and conduct research and development, and to "play a leading role in the creation of a science and technology culture" in the country.  

TÜBİTAK develops scientific and technological policies and manages R&D institutes, carrying on research, technology and development studies in line with "national priorities". TÜBİTAK also acts as an advisory agency to the Turkish government and acts as the secretariat of the Supreme Council for Science and Technology, the highest science and technology policymaking body in Turkey.

History

TÜBİTAK was established by President Cemal Gürsel, who first formed a scientific council to guide the Ministry of Defense (in parallel to a separate scientific law council to write the new constitution of the Turkish Republic) in 1960 and later ordered the foundation of the broader Scientific and Technological Research Council of Turkey as the extended continuation of his MoD Scientific Council with the primary advisory duty of providing guidance to the government's plans and policies.

Subsequently, the bill "278" passed on July 24, 1963, in the new era of planned economy subsequent to the first five-year development plan of the country, set the official record for the Council's presence and duties. Cahit Arf, who was appointed by Gursel as the founding director and whose leading foundation work was assisted by a group of scientists including Prof. Erdal İnönü, was subsequently named as the first chairman of the Council on December 26, 1963. The Council's first ten members were professors Erdal İnönü, Ratip Berker, Hikmet Binark, Mecit Çağatay, Reşat Garan, Feza Gürsey, Orhan Işık, Mustafa İnan, Atıf Şengün and İhsan Topaloğlu. They nominated Professor Nimet Özdaş as the first secretary general of TÜBİTAK effective March 1, 1964.

At that time of its establishment, TÜBİTAK's primary tasks at the time were supporting basic and applied academic research and encouraging careers in science by providing incentives to young researchers, in particular to those working in natural sciences. To carry out these tasks, four research grant committees were set up to fund projects in the areas of basic sciences, engineering, medicine, agriculture and animal husbandry. The number now stands at ten and also includes one assigned to social sciences and humanities, all functioning under the Research Support Programmes Department. A separate “Scientist Training Group”, also set up at the time to orient promising students towards scientific careers and help their advancement thereafter, has now evolved into the present Science Fellowships and Grant Programmes Division.

Activities
TÜBİTAK is responsible for the development and coordination of scientific research in line with the national targets and priorities, set by the Turkish Academy of Sciences (TÜBA). More than 2,500 researchers work at the 15 different research institutes and research centers attached to TÜBİTAK, where both contract-based and targeted nationwide research is conducted. TÜBİTAK represents Turkey in international research efforts including memberships in European Science Foundation and the European Union Framework Programmes for Research and Technological Development.

Following research centers and institutes are subordinate to TÜBİTAK:
 Marmara Research Center (MAM)
 Energy Institute
 Food Institute
 Chemical Technology Institute
 Environment and Cleaner Production Institute
 Materials Institute
 Earth and Marine Sciences Institute
 Genetic Engineering and Biotechnology Institute
 Center of Research for Advanced Technologies of Informatics and Information Security (BILGEM)
 Advanced Technologies Research Institute
 National Research Institute of Electronics and Cryptology
 Information Technologies Institute
 Research Institute of Fundamental Sciences
 Research Institute for Software Development
 Cyber Security Institute
 Defense Industries Research and Development Institute (SAGE)
 Space Technologies Research Institute (UZAY)
 National Metrology Institute (UME)
 Turkish Institute of Management Sciences (TUSSIDE)
 Technology Free Zone and Technopark
 National Academic Network and Information Center (ULAKBİM)
 Bursa Test and Analysis Laboratory (BUTAL)
 National Observatory (TUG)
 Rail Transport Technologies Institute (RUTE)

Awards
TÜBİTAK gives following awards:
 Science Award to living scientists for significant contributions to the advancement of universal science (:Category:Recipients of TÜBİTAK Science Award)
 Service Award to those, who have significantly served the development of science and technology (:Category:Recipients of TÜBİTAK Service Award)
 Incentive Award to living scientists under the age of 40 and who have proved to have the necessary qualifications to contribute to science in the future at an international level,
 Special Award to Turkish scientists living abroad (equivalent to the TÜBITAK Science Award).

Products and projects

 MILCEP
 RASAT
 BALISTIKA
 AKIS - Smart ID
 HGK - Guidance Kit
TUBITAK-SAGE SARB-83 - Penetration bomb
TUBITAK-SAGE TOGAN  -  Air-to-surface launched 81 mm mortar munition
TUBITAK-SAGE BOZOK  - Laser-guided UAV bomb
TUBITAK-SAGE KUZGUN  Modular joint ammunition
 Landmine Detection by 3D
 Pardus
 Seeker Head
ETMTS-2 - Hand-Held Mine Detection System
ETMTS-3 (ALPER) - Hand-Held Mine Detection System
OZAN - Foldable Metal Mine Detector
SOM (missile)
HGK (bomb)
KGK smart wing adapter kit
TOROS artillery rocket system
Thermal battery
NEB bunker buster
GÖKTUĞ

See also
 Turkish National Research Institute of Electronics and Cryptology (UEKAE), bound to TÜBİTAK
 Turkish Academy of Sciences (TÜBA)
 Turkish Informatics Olympiad
 Bilim ve Teknik

References

External links
Official website
Tubitak Academic Journals

 
1963 establishments in Turkey
Scientific organizations established in 1963
Members of the International Council for Science
Government agencies of Turkey
Members of the International Science Council